Fausto B. Pichardo is a Dominican American police officer and administrator, and is the former Chief of Patrol Bureau in the NYPD. In this capacity he oversees some 22,000 uniformed police officers in New York City and is the first Dominican American to reach his position.

The Patrol Services Bureau is the largest and most visible bureau in the NYPD, overseeing a majority of the department's uniformed officers on patrol.

Early life
Pichardo was born in the Dominican Republic, in a village called Dicayagua de Arriba. He immigrated to the United States when he was nine, and grew up on the Lower East Side and attended public schools.

Career
Pichardo started his career in law enforcement as a patrolman in 1999 after graduating from the New York City Police Academy. as the Executive Officer of the Patrol Services Bureau where he oversaw the department's 77 Precincts throughout the city. On October 13, 2020, Chief Pichardo announced and filed for retirement. Retirement to take effect November, 2020.

Education
Attended NYC High School for the Humanities. Chief Pichardo holds a Bachelor of Arts degree in Criminal Justice from John Jay College of Criminal Justice, and also a Masters of Public Administration degree in Government from Marist College. He is also a 2015 graduate of the Police Management Institute at Columbia University, and a 2008 graduate of the FBI National Academy at Quantico, Virginia.

Dates of Rank
Sworn in as a Patrolman - 1999

 Promoted to Sergeant - 2005

 Promoted to Lieutenant - 2008

 Promoted to Captain - 2011

  Promoted to Deputy Inspector - 2013

 Promoted to Inspector 2015

 Promoted to Assistant Chief - 2018

 Promoted to Chief of Patrol - 2019

External links

References

New York City Police Department officers
Living people
Columbia University alumni
Year of birth missing (living people)